On Valentine's Day is a 1986 American drama film directed  by Ken Harrison. It is the sequel of Harrison's 1918. It was entered into the main competition at the 43rd Venice International Film Festival and was screened at the 1986 Toronto International Film Festival.

Plot
On Valentine's Day is the central film in Horton Foote's semi-autobiographical trilogy that also includes Courtship (film) and 1918. It is a nearly verbatim retelling of his stage play and the sets and costumes.

Cast 

 William Converse-Roberts as  Horace Robedaux
 Hallie Foote as Elizabeth Robedaux 
 Rochelle Oliver as Mrs. Mary Vaughn 
 Michael Higgins as Mr. Vaughn 
 Matthew Broderick as Brother Vaughn
 Richard Jenkins as Bobby Pate 
 Steven Hill as George Tyler
 Irma P. Hall as Aunt Charity 
 Bill McGhee as Sam the Cemetery Worker 
 Carol Goodheart as Miss Ruth 
 Horton Foote Jr. as Jessie 
  Tim Green  as Sheriff

References

External links 

American drama films
1986 drama films
1986 films
Films with screenplays by Horton Foote
American sequel films
1980s English-language films
1980s American films
English-language drama films